Frederick Dent may refer to:

 Frederick B. Dent (1922–2019), United States Secretary of Commerce
 Frederick Tracy Dent (1820–1892), American general